Lampart Futball Club is a Hungarian football club from the town of Budapest.

History
Lampart FC debuted in the 1941–42 season of the Hungarian League and finished fourteenth  .

Name Changes 
1937–1938: FÉG-Lampart
1938: merger with Erzsébet FC
1938–1943: Lampart FC
1943–1945: Fegyvergyári SK
1945–1948: Lampart SE
1948: merger with Pasaréti SE 
1948–1951: Lampart MSK
1951–1952: Vasas Lampart SK
1952–1957: Vasas Kőbányai Zománc
1957–?:Lampart SE

References

External links
 Profile

Football clubs in Hungary
1937 establishments in Hungary